This is a list of notable lingerie brands and their country of manufacture. This list catalogues brands known primarily for their lingerie or underwear, and not fashion or clothing in general.

See also

 List of fashion designers
 List of sock manufacturers
 List of swimwear brands

References

Lingerie brands
Lingerie brands
 
Lingerie brands